

Champions
National League: Boston Beaneaters
American Association: Boston Reds

World Series: Boston (NL) declined to meet Boston (AA)

Major league baseball final standings

National League final standings

American Association final standings

Statistical leaders

National League statistical leaders

American Association statistical leaders

Notable seasons
Philadelphia Phillies left fielder Billy Hamilton leads the NL with 179 hits, 111 stolen bases, 141 runs scored, and a .340 batting average. His .874 OPS and 155 OPS+ both rank second in the league.
Chicago Colts pitcher Bill Hutchinson has a record of 44-19 and leads the NL with 561 innings pitched and 44 wins. His 261 strikeouts rank second in the league. He has a 2.81 earned run average and a 123 ERA+.

Events

January–March
January 16 - An agreement is signed between the National League, American Association, and Western Association which creates a three man panel to settle any and all disputes between the three leagues. The agreement occurs two days after the National League allowed the American Association to place a team in Boston, a move the NL's Boston Beaneaters opposed.
January 30 - The Boston Reds purchase the contract of second baseman Cupid Childs from the Syracuse Stars for $2,000.
February 1 - The New York Giants sell the contract of Jesse Burkett to the Cleveland Spiders
February 6 – The New York Giants' salary list is leaked to the press. It shows a total player payroll of $54,600 with Buck Ewing's $5,500 salary topping the scale.

April–June
April 11 – Clark Griffith‚ 21 years old‚ makes his Major League debut‚ pitching for the St. Louis Browns to a 13–5 victory over the Cincinnati Kelly's Killers. After spending much of 1892 and 1893 in the minor leagues‚ Griffith will return to remain active in the majors as a pitcher‚ manager‚ and club owner until his death in 1955.
April 22 – In the first game at the third Polo Grounds, Boston beats the New York Giants, 4-3.
May 1 – Cleveland's League Park opens with 10,000 fans on hand to see pitcher Cy Young beat Cincinnati, 12-3.
May 14 – Charles Radbourn of the Cincinnati Reds records his 300th career win.
May 17 - Hughie Jennings is signed by Louisville Colonels
May 22 – At Cincinnati's League Park, Mickey Welch of the New York Giants hits into a game-ending triple play. Batting with the bases loaded in the ninth inning, Welch lines one to shortstop Germany Smith, who catches the ball and tosses it to second baseman, Bid McPhee, who tags the runner caught off second, Charley Bassett. McPhee then relay the ball to first baseman, John Reilly, who toes the sack to retire the runner, Artie Clarke, who was running between bases. The Reds won 8–3.
June 1 - Fred Dunlap is released by the Washington Statesmen. 
June 22 – Tom Lovett throws a no-hitter as the Brooklyn Grooms defeat the New York Giants, 4-0.
June 30 - The Cincinnati Reds sign former batting champion Pete Browning.

July–September
July 1 – Chicago Colts outfielder Jimmy Ryan hits for the cycle in a 9–3 win over the Cleveland Spiders.  It's the second time in Ryan's career that he has hit for the cycle.
July 31 – New York Giants pitcher Amos Rusie no-hits the Brooklyn Bridegrooms 6-0, on 8 walks and 4 K's. At 20 years and 2 months he is the youngest pitcher to toss a no-hitter.
August 26 – John McGraw debuts with the Baltimore Orioles in the AA. He plays shortstop, makes an error, and he has a hit as the Orioles defeat the Columbus Buckeyes, 6-5.
September 4 – Responding to writers who claim it's time for him to quit, Chicago's 39-year-old player-manager Cap Anson wears a false white beard against Boston.  It doesn't help him at the plate – he is hitless in 3 at-bats. The White Stockings beat Boston, 5-3.
September 12 – Milwaukee Brewers outfielder Abner Dalrymple hits for the cycle in a 10–4 win over the Washington Statesmen.

October–December
October 4 – On the final day of the American Association season, Ted Breitenstein of the St. Louis Browns throws a no-hitter against the Louisville Colonels, in an 8–0 Browns win.  It is Breitenstein's first major league start. He faced the minimum number of batters, 27, allowing just one base on balls.  It was also the last no-hitter thrown in the American Association, as the league folded following the season.
November 26 – A series for the championship of the Pacific Coast begins between the champions of the California League (the San Jose Dukes) and the Pacific Northwest League pennant winners (the Portland Webfeet). San Jose wins the opener, 8–6. The series will last until January 10 with San Jose winning 10 games to 9. All the games are played in San Jose, California.

Births

January
January 1 – Charlie Schmutz
January 2 – Joe Lotz
January 3 – John Dowd
January 3 – Charlie Harding
January 8 – Bud Weiser
January 14 – John Shovlin
January 15 – Ray Chapman
January 15 – Leo Townsend
January 16 – Marv Goodwin
January 16 – Ferdie Schupp
January 20 – Earl Smith
January 23 – Raymond Haley
January 23 – Orie Kerlin
January 23 – King Lear
January 25 – George Lyons
January 27 – Al Tesch
January 28 – Bill Doak
January 29 – Esty Chaney
January 31 – Tim Hendryx
January 31 – Tex McDonald

February
February 5 – Roger Peckinpaugh
February 7 – Bill Dalrymple
February 18 – Sherry Smith
February 18 – Zip Zabel
February 22 – Clarence Mitchell
February 26 – Jack Hammond

March
March 1 – Roy Elsh
March 2 – William Fischer
March 4 – José Acosta
March 4 – Dazzy Vance
March 5 – Walt Alexander
March 6 – Frank Fletcher
March 6 – Clarence Garrett
March 8 – Ollie O'Mara
March 12 – Jack Little
March 14 – Dave Gregg
March 19 – Rube Schauer
March 20 – Joe Boehling
March 24 – Ernie Shore
March 25 – Polly McLarry
March 26 – Hardin Barry
March 27 – Bill Rumler
March 31 – Jim Brown
March 31 – Johnny Couch

April
April 16 – Charlie Meara
April 16 – Ricardo Torres
April 17 – Scott Perry
April 20 – Dave Bancroft
April 22 – Billy Orr
April 24 – Pete Falsey
April 30 – Tony Brottem

May
May 2 – John Leary
May 3 – Eppa Rixey
May 4 – Frank Bruggy
May 4 – Vic Saier
May 5 – Bruno Haas
May 5 – Jack McCandless
May 8 – Red Hoff
May 10 – Bob Geary
May 11 – Roger Salmon
May 15 – Karl Meister
May 19 – Dixie Carroll
May 19 – George Clark
May 19 – Dutch Schliebner
May 20 – Joe Harris
May 21 – Doc Ayers
May 21 – Bunny Hearn
May 22 – Bill Cramer
May 24 – Pete Sims
May 26 – Gene Paulette

June
June 1 – Hank Severeid
June 1 – Homer Thompson
June 2 – Oscar Horstmann
June 3 – Bill McTigue
June 8 – Buck Danner
June 9 – Charlie Kavanagh
June 13 – Marty Kavanagh
June 14 – Jack Reis
June 14 – Frank Withrow
June 15 – Frank Crossin
June 15 – Lou North
June 17 – Zeb Terry
June 21 – Bert Adams
June 23 – Al Clauss
June 23 – Johnny Priest
June 25 – Pete Lapan
June 26 – Mike Fitzgerald
June 26 – Al Huenke

July
July 1 – Fritz Scheeren
July 3 – Joe Houser
July 4 – Stump Edington
July 6 – Steve O'Neill
July 8 – Clyde Barfoot
July 9 – Jim Scoggins
July 12 – Hank Schreiber
July 15 – Jim Breton
July 17 – Eddie Brown
July 19 – Earl Hamilton
July 22 – George Baumgardner
July 22 – Herb Herring
July 23 – Jack Theis
July 28 – Joe Mathes
July 29 – Fred Smith

August
August 1 – Bob Emmerich
August 4 – Jim Haislip
August 8 – Chick Keating
August 11 – Karl Adams
August 11 – Walter Barbare
August 12 – Bill Lathrop
August 15 – Tim Bowden
August 17 – Jack Powell
August 17 – Arch Reilly
August 18 – Wally Gerber
August 19 – Al DeVormer
August 19 – Herbert Hill
August 19 – Ike McAuley
August 20 – Ed Hovlik
August 21 – Jim Eschen
August 22 – Happy Felsch
August 26 – Bill Hopper
August 28 – Byron Houck
August 29 – Ray Callahan
August 30 – Steve Partenheimer
August 30 – Pol Perritt

September
September 1 – Austin Walsh
September 3 – Katsy Keifer
September 7 – Fred Blackwell
September 8 – Verne Clemons
September 9 – Dan Costello
September 10 – Joe Evers
September 12 – Joe Peploski
September 16 – Rogelio Crespo
September 16 – George Orme
September 16 – Dick Robertson
September 21 – Gil Britton
September 21 – Pete Shields
September 24 – Paddy Siglin
September 26 – Tinsley Ginn
September 27 – Doug Baird
September 28 – Everett Booe

October
October 2 – Eddie Murphy
October 7 – George Batten
October 8 – Doug Neff
October 8 – Monte Pfeffer
October 13 – Fred McMullin
October 14 – Bert Gallia
October 30 – Charlie Deal

November
November 1 – Heinie Stafford
November 3 – Charles Spearman
November 5 – Greasy Neale
November 6 – Jeff McCleskey
November 6 – Red Torphy
November 7 – Tracy Baker
November 11 – Rabbit Maranville
November 12 – Carl Mays
November 18 – Arthur Hauger
November 20 – Leon Cadore
November 30 – Joe Giebel

December
December 1 – Johnny O'Connor
December 3 – Larry Gilbert
December 11 – Erwin Renfer
December 12 – Tom Daly
December 13 – Bob Wright
December 14 – Al Tedrow
December 16 – Fred Tyler
December 19 – Pep Goodwin
December 28 – Doc Carroll
December 29 – Dave Skeels
December 31 – Charlie Flannigan

Deaths
January 13 – Joe Connors, age unknown, pitched 3 games in 1884 in the Union Association.
February 6 – Tom Healey, 37?, pitcher in 1878.
February 25 – Jeremiah Reardon, 22?, pitcher who appeared in 2 games in 1886.
April 14 – Frank Bell, 27?, played for the 1885 Brooklyn Grays.
May 20 – Jim Fogarty, 27, utility player from 1884–1890.  Led the National League in stolen bases with 99 in 1889.
May 21 – Jim Whitney, 33, pitcher who had five 20-win seasons, including 37 for 1883 Boston champions; led NL in wins, games and innings as 1881 rookie, in strikeouts in 1883; good hitter also played center field, batted .323 in 1882.
June 10 – Jerry Dorgan, 34?, reserve player from 1880–1885.
July 2 – John Cassidy, 34?, right fielder for five teams who batted .378 for the 1877 Hartford Dark Blues.
July 14 – Bill Crowley, 34, outfielder from 1875–1885.
July 29 – Steve Matthias, 31?, shortstop for the 1884 Chicago Browns/Pittsburgh Stogies of the Union Association.
August 25 – Jerry Sweeney, 31?, 1st baseman for the 1884 Kansas City Cowboys.
August 28 – Joe Miller, 41, 2nd baseman who played from 1872–1875.
October 11 – Will Smalley, 20, 3rd baseman for the 1890 Cleveland Spiders.
October 14 – Larry Corcoran, 32, pitcher who won 175 games for the Chicago White Stockings from 1880 to 1885, led NL in wins, strikeouts and ERA once each; first pitcher to coordinate signals with his catcher, threw three no-hitters.
October 21 – Ed Daily, 29, pitcher from 1885–1891.  Won 26 games in 1885.
November 19 – Ernie Hickman, 35?, starting pitcher for the Kansas City Cowboys of the Union Association in 1884.

References

External links
1891 National League season at Baseball-Reference.com
1891 American Association season at Baseball-Reference.com
Charlton's Baseball Chronology at BaseballLibrary.com
Year by Year History at Baseball-Almanac.com
Retrosheet.org